John Fresshe (sometimes Frossh, Fresche, Froysh or Frosh) (died 6 September 1397) was a citizen, alderman, and Mayor of London in the latter years of the fourteenth century. A merchant by trade, he was a member of the Mercers' Company, a medieval London trade guild, and has been described as one of London's "leading citizens at the end of the century".

His early life is unknown to historians, and he only appears in the records with his marriage to Juliana, the daughter of an influential merchant in 1373. From then on, promotion within the city of London's political machinery was swift. He soon became an alderman, or councillor, and undertook service to both the city and the King, Richard II. He encountered personal and political difficulties in 1381 after the Peasants' Revolt. In the early 1380s, he and his colleagues in other victualling trade guild clashed with a reformist tendency within the Common council led by John Northampton. In revenge, the reformer accused Fresshe of treasonously assisting the rebels, and he was imprisoned for a short time. Fresshe's party was soon able to take power on the council, and Fresshe was restored to favour.

With this exception, Fresshe appears to have avoided too many political pitfalls. He concentrated on his mercantile interests, making himself a lot of money in the process and, by acting as a broker for his colleagues, them as well. The one interruption to this peaceful existence came in 1392, when the King, dissatisfied with the common council's running of London affairs, had all the city's officials arrested for a short period and suspended the city's rights to appoint its mayor and council. This crisis does not seem to have interrupted Fresshe for long; he and his colleagues were soon released, and, indeed, in 1394 Fresshe was himself elected mayor. He died in 1397 and was buried in the St Benet Sherehog church, which had been receiving his patronage for some years. His wife survived him, and their three daughters made good marriages into the families of Fresshe's fellow merchants.

Early life 
Nothing is known of John Fresshe's early life. Historian Carol Rawcliffe has suggested that, since he later married the third daughter of a leading Mercer, Fresshe could have been apprenticed to him as a young man. It is, however, only with his marriage that Fresshe starts appearing on city records. Juliana (in some sources, Gillian) not only brought a dower but also the right to pursue an unpaid debt to her father from the time of Edward III, in which Fresshe was successful. Although Fresshe's date of birth is unknown, he was a wealthy man even in the early days of his career, as he made a donation to the fund the city had organised in their attempt to encourage the "great lords of the realm" to return to Westminster for the proposed council.

Career 

Fresshe was elected alderman of the city of London's Bassishaw Ward from 12 March 1381. He had been appointed a collector of King Richard II's ill-fated poll tax within the city from December 1380. It was this tax which was to provoke the outbreak of the Peasants' Revolt in June the next year. Fresshe was one of three such men—along with fellow mercers, John Horn and Adam Karlille—to be sent by the then-mayor, William Walworth, to meet with the army assembled by rebel leader Wat Tyler at Blackheath in June 1381. Juliet Barker suggests that this was a pivotal meeting in the history of the revolt. The Mayor instructed Fresshe and his colleagues to negotiate with the rebels, and, if possible, persuade them to withdraw. However, Horn, says Barker, even though the rebels "had been on the point of returning to their homes...exceeded his authority". Horn, supposedly, told them "that the whole city of London felt as they did". The degree to which Fresshe supported Horn's actions is unclear: one later Inquisition—held Easter 1383—suggests that both aldermen indeed supported Horn while one in November found otherwise. Fresshe was bailed until January 1384, by which time his fellow Mercer, Brembre, was mayor. The three envoys do, however, seem to have encouraged the mob to set the Marshalsea Prison on fire and "it is doubtful there was even much disapproval when the marshal, Richard Imworth, was dragged from sanctuary at Westminster and murdered".

Mercantile career 
Successful trading made Fresshe an extremely wealthy man. He did not confine himself to mercery but particularly involved himself in the lucrative wool trade to the continent. The quantities could be substantial: in 1385 he was licensed to send 13 sarples of wool to Calais. As a mercer, he employed "a full complement" of apprentices. In 1392, for example, these were William Walderne, Walter Cotton, Thomas Grene and Thomas Welle. They did not only learn the Mercer's trade from Fresshe; he also used them as his agents in Calais to further his wool trading; one such example is his apprentice William Waldern, who performed such a duty for Fresshe in 1388. Fresshe also bought and sold for his colleagues, and Walderne's mission was brokering Nicholas Brembre's wool abroad. Fresshe also traded luxury cloth worth hundreds of pounds to Calais and Portugal.

Fresshe not only made money but looked after it too. Although he seems to have been a ready lender, he was also a ready litigant when it was necessary to recover the loans. Between 1381 and 1383 he commenced nine debt recovery lawsuits, recovering over £90. He brought one such suit against his wife's cousin, John Langrich.

Feud with John of Northampton
Following the revolt, Walworth lost the mayoral election. His successor was John Northampton, a radical with a populist agenda. Fresshe, as a leading Mercer, was caught up in the political confrontation between Northampton and the victualling companies. Indeed, says Rawcliffe, Northampton's election posed a serious challenge to Fresshe, and even "threatened to terminate [his] promising career". Northampton was temporarily successful in his campaign against the victuallers. Some aldermen, including a number of Northampton's political enemies, had been suspected of assisting the rebels of 1381. Northampton petitioned to have them brought to trial on a treason charge, although nothing was done until October 1382. Fresshe and four others—William Tonge, vintner, John Horn, fishmonger Adam Karlille and Walter Sibil, also of the Fishmongers' Guild were accused of helping the rebels to enter London. They were also accused of attacking the Guildhall in an attempt to seek out and burn the Jubilee Book on 14 June. Northampton and his supporters had "engineered these proceedings as a means of undermining the party of the merchant capitalists" (as the victualling guilds have been described). Fresshe, although not charged as severely as his colleagues, was subsequently imprisoned alongside them in the Tower of London. Fresshe's imprisonment subsequently excluded him and the others from civic office for the next year. Northampton, though, only served a single term of office, and Fresshe and his colleagues were pardoned within a few months when their fellow Mercer–and Fresshe's business partner–Nicholas Brembre became mayor. After another inquisition, all four men were "unanimously" found to be innocent of all charges.

Later political career and life

Fresshe's ally Mayor Brembre, served three terms of office. During the second term, from 1384–85, Fresshe served as city sheriff alongside Exton. The same year Fresshe was a member of the council group which petitioned the King for Northampton's execution. After serving two terms as mayor, Fresshe served again as alderman. In 1385 he was elected alderman to Cordwainer Ward. He held this office until 1394. In a writ dated 13 November 1393, Fresshe was summoned to the parliament meeting at Westminster the following year. On 22 June 1392 Fresshe, as a common councillor and with his colleagues, attended upon the King in Northampton, on his summons. There, the King denounced the civic leaders, telling them that he had found–unspecified–"notable and evident defaults" with their governance of the city which had induced his ill-pleasure. London's ability and right to self-govern was immediately suspended; the King sent in his own men as wardens in place of the common council; and Fresshe and the other ex-civic leadership were summoned before a tribunal in Eton. Fresshe seems to have come through this turbulent period relatively unscathed, and indeed, he had no objection to loaning the King £200 in October 1396. This may be, says Rawcliffe, because "given that Richard’s indignation against the Londoners was initially aroused because of their refusal to advance £5,000 in credit, Frosh [sic], as one of the richest citizens of the day, may well have been singled out for a particular display of royal displeasure".

Personal life 
Sometime before March 1373 Fresshe married Juliana Plucket, daughter of William Langrich and widow of Fresshe's fellow Mercer Nicholas Pluket. They had three daughters, all of whom made good marriages. The eldest, Christine, had married a royal official, one John Squiry, Escheator of Essex. Another married grocer and alderman Walter Newenton, who would be sheriff of London from 1411 to 1412. Margaret married Walter Cotton, one of Fresshe's old apprentices, and who, says Rawcliffe, "prospered as a result, becoming an alderman and sheriff, like his master before him". Newenton and Cotton were also Fresshe's feoffees and executors; the latter and Margery, received the rent and reversion of Fresshe's tenements in Cheapside in his will.

John Fresshe was active in the Mercer's trade up until his death, which occurred on 6 September 1397. Rawcliffe has described him as "among the wealthiest merchants in London", a judgement illustrated by his will. Fresshe left over £600 to be distributed among his relatives, friends and colleagues. His wife received his plate and his eldest daughter an annuity of 50 marks. He left a quitrent from a tenement in Knightrider Street, to John Newton, rector of St Benet Sherehog on Poultry. This was to provide for a chantry, and this portion of the bequest has been noted as being one of only two that the church received that were designated specifically to the maintenance and upkeep of the physical fabric of the building. Fresshe directed that he should also be buried in the church's St. Sith's chapel; for this, he left an additional bequest of nine marks. This paid for a chaplain to celebrate mass for four years, "for his soul, the souls of his wife and children and all Christian souls". John Stow indicated that, after death, Fresshe had a monument to him within the Church. Fresshe had supported St. Benet Sherehog since at least 1395, when he and grocer William Chichele–brother of Henry, later Archbishop of Canterbury–had made it a joint-grant. Fresshe's Inquisition post mortem was held in 1398.

Official and estates 
Apart from his early appointments as tax collector and alderman–the latter which lasted until his death–Fresshe performed many other official duties for the city and the crown. Only men who had previously been elected Sheriff could also stand for mayor, and thus Fresshe was Sheriff of London and Middlesex from September 1384 – 1385. In 1384 he was also elected to the common council, and in November that year, he was also appointed gaol deliverer for the city. Fresshe was elected mayor in October 1394 for a year, when he was replaced by William Moore, vintner. Not all of his positions were in the city. Sometime around Easter 1386, he received the Forestership of Waltham Hundred, Essex. This office was a hereditary position he inherited by right of his wife, although they seem soon after to have conveyed the forestership to the Abbey of Waltham soon after. On 12 December 1390 the King made him a Constable of the Westminster Staple. Fresshe held this post until 7 July 1393. The previous year he had also been appointed to a commission to confiscate the goods and property of the Count of Vertus. Fresshe had a portfolio of Essex estates and properties which had been brought to him by his wife, whose father had been a substantial landholder in the county. In the north of the county, she inherited a small estate in Nazeing, and in the south, the manor of North Ockendon and lands in Cranham. The estate that Fresshe held by his wife may have been worth much more than the stated amount of £6. In London, she brought him a house in Cordwainer Street as part of her dower. Fresshe continued to augment his Essex holdings in his own right, purchasing the watermill and land in Havering-atte-Bower, and becoming lord of the manor of Dovores, an area which stretched from Havering to Bowers Gifford.

Notes

References

Bibliography

 
 
 
 
 
 
 
 
 
 
 
 
 
 
 
 
 
 
 
 
 
 
 
 
 
 
 
 
 
 
 
 

14th-century lord mayors of London
Members of the Parliament of England for the City of London
14th-century English politicians

14th-century births
1397 deaths
Year of birth unknown